Suzana Vujošević (born 6 August 1990) is a Serbian–Montenegrin footballer who plays as a defender. She has been a member of the Montenegro women's national team.

References

1990 births
Living people
Women's association football defenders
Montenegrin women's footballers
Montenegro women's international footballers
Montenegrin expatriate footballers
Montenegrin expatriate sportspeople in Albania
Expatriate footballers in Albania
Serbian expatriate women's footballers
Serbian expatriate sportspeople in Albania
ŽFK Mašinac PZP Niš players
KFF Vllaznia Shkodër players